Fomentinvest is a Portuguese investment holding company headquartered in Lisbon. It comprises three main businesses: Fomentinvest ambiente (environment); Fomentinvest atmosfera (atmosphere); and Fomentinvest energia (energy).

Businesses
Fomentinvest Ambiente presents a wide investment portfolio in the areas of environment and disposal of urban waste in Portugal.
Fomentinvest Atmosfera positions itself in the energy, carbon and climate change area.
Fomentinvest Energia presents a wide investment portfolio in the field of renewable energies, located in Portugal, Spain, Brazil, and Uruguay.

Notable members
Its chairman is Ângelo Correia. Until 2010 the company's managing staff included the politician Pedro Passos Coelho who was elected Prime Minister of Portugal in 2011.

References

External links
Official website

Investment companies
Private equity firms
Solar energy companies
Holding companies of Portugal
Investment management companies
Energy companies established in 2008
Renewable energy companies of Europe
Holding companies established in 2008
Portuguese companies established in 2008
Renewable resource companies established in 2008